Alessandro Roberto (born 22 May 1977) is an Italian former alpine skier who completed predominantly in the Giant slalom discipline between 1995 and 2009.

Career
He began to compete in International Ski Federation sanctioned events in 1995.

He competed at the 2001 FIS World Alpine Ski Championships finishing in 13th position in the Giant slalom. Roberto went on to qualify for the 2002 Winter Olympics. There he finished in 22nd position in the Giant slalom. He continued to ski competitively until 2009.

References

External links

1977 births
Living people
Italian male alpine skiers
Olympic alpine skiers of Italy
Alpine skiers at the 2002 Winter Olympics
Italian alpine skiing coaches